The Enhanced Tactical Fighter (ETF) was a strike fighter/interdictor program conducted by the United States Air Force (USAF) between 1980 and 1984, to seek replacements for the General Dynamics F-111 Aardvark.  It resulted in the McDonnell Douglas F-15E Strike Eagle.

Competition

In March 1981, the USAF announced the Enhanced Tactical Fighter program to procure a replacement for the F-111 Aardvark. The program was later renamed the Dual-Role Fighter (DRF) competition. The concept envisioned an aircraft capable of launching deep air interdiction missions without requiring additional support by fighter escort or jamming.

General Dynamics submitted the F-16XL, while McDonnell Douglas submitted the F-15E Strike Eagle. The Panavia Tornado was also a candidate, but since the aircraft lacked a credible air superiority fighter capability, coupled with the fact that it is not American-made, it was not seriously considered. The DRF evaluation team, under the direction of Brigadier General Ronald W. Yates, ran from 1981 through 30 April 1983.

Though the two aircraft were competing for the same role, they were fairly different in design approach. The twin-engine F-15E Strike Eagle is basically an F-15D Eagle two-seat trainer with the back-seat station modified to support ground-attack instruments. The single-engine F-16XL has major structural and aerodynamic differences from the original F-16 Fighting Falcon, resulting in a promising design which, with its radically redesigned cranked-delta wing, greatly boosted performance; if selected, the single- and two-seat versions were to be designated F-16E and F-16F, respectively. As such, the XL would have required much more effort, time and money to put into full production. Additionally, the Strike Eagle has two engines, which gives it more thrust and capacity to carry more weapons and/or armor. Furthermore, engine redundancy can be very useful for an aircraft whose mission involves operating within the reach of anti-aircraft artillery and surface-to-air missiles, in addition to the standard threats of fighter aircraft and interceptors.

On 24 February 1984, the USAF chose the F-15E; key factors in the decision were the F-15E's lower development costs compared to the F-16XL (US$270 million versus US$470 million), a belief that the F-15E had future growth potential, and possessing twin-engine redundancy. The USAF was initially expected to procure 400 aircraft, a figure later revised to 392. The two F-16XLs were returned to the USAF and placed in storage at Edwards Air Force Base, Mojave, California.

References

Military aircraft procurement programs of the United States